Joseph Bernard Brunini (July 24, 1909 – January 7, 1996) was an American prelate of the Roman Catholic Church. He served as bishop of the Diocese of Jackson in Mississippi from 1967 to 1984.

Biography

Early life 
Joseph Brunini was born in Vicksburg, Mississippi, the sixth child of John and Blanche (née Stein) Brunini. John Brunini was the son of Italian immigrants and worked as a lawyer, founding the law firm Brunini, Grantham, Grower & Hewes (now Brunini, Attorneys at Law); Blanche Brunini was Jewish. 

After attending St. Aloysius High School in Vicksburg, Joseph Brunini studied at Georgetown University in Washington, D.C., obtaining a Bachelor of Arts degree in 1930. He then furthered his studies in Rome at the Pontifical North American College and the Pontifical Urbaniana University, earning a Bachelor of Sacred Theology degree in 1931.

Priesthood 
While in Rome, Brunini was ordained to the priesthood for the Diocese of Natchez by Cardinal Francesco Selvaggiani on December 5, 1933.

Following his return to the United States, Brunini completed his graduate studies at the Catholic University of America and later obtained a Doctor of Canon Law in 1937. He then returned to Mississippi and was named a curate at St. Mary's Cathedral in Natchez, where he became rector in 1943. He was raised to the rank of privy chamberlain in 1944, and served as chancellor (1941-1951) and vicar general (1951-1957) of the diocese. He was made a domestic prelate in 1948 and pastor of St. Peter's Cathedral at Jackson in 1949.

Auxiliary Bishop of Natchez-Jackson 
On November 28, 1956, Brunini was appointed auxiliary bishop of what was then the Diocese of Natchez-Jackson and Titular Bishop of Axomis by Pope Pius XII. He received his episcopal consecration on January 29, 1957, from Bishop Richard Gerow, with Bishops Charles Greco and John Morkovsky serving as co-consecrators. In addition to his episcopal duties, he continued to serve as vicar general and pastor of St. Peter's Cathedral.

Bishop of Natchez-Jackson and Jackson 
Following the resignation of Bishop Gerow, Brunini was named the eighth bishop of the Diocese of Natchez-Jackson by Pope Paul VI on December 2, 1967. He was the first native Mississippian to serve in that post. During his tenure, he was an outspoken advocate of the civil rights movement; he once declared, "We as religious leaders can't blame the politicians if we don't do our job first." He co-found and served as the first president of the Mississippi Religious Leadership Conference. 

The Diocese of Natchez-Jackson was changed to the Diocese of Jackson on March 1, 1977, with Brunini remaining as its bishop.

After sixteen years as Bishop of Jackson, Brunini retired on January 24, 1984. Joseph Brunini died while attending a conference in Convent, Louisiana, on January 7, 1996, at age 86.

References

Episcopal succession

1909 births
1996 deaths
Georgetown University alumni
People from Vicksburg, Mississippi
Roman Catholic bishops of Jackson
Catholic University of America alumni
20th-century Roman Catholic bishops in the United States
American people of Jewish descent
American people of Italian descent
Pontifical North American College alumni
Pontifical Urban University alumni
Activists for African-American civil rights